Nance–Horan syndrome is a rare X-linked dominant syndrome characterized by congenital cataracts leading to profound vision loss, characteristic dysmorphic features, and dental anomalies. Microcornea, microphthalmia, and mild or moderate intellectual disability may accompany these features. Heterozygous females often manifest similarly but with less severe features than affected males.

Presentation

Dental features:
 small teeth in males
 pointed (screwdriver shaped or conical) incisors (sometimes called Hutchinson teeth)
 incisors with an irregular incisal edge
 canines: enlarged and globular; may be dome or bud shaped with trilobed edge
 premolars and molars: small, round and globular; may have supernumary lobes (mulberry or lotus flower shape)
 widely separated teeth (diastemma)
 hypoplastic enamel
 dental agenesis
 presence of mesiodents (median incisor behind normal upper incisors)
 pulp chamber anomalies

Facial features:
 anteverted pinnae
 long face
 prominent nasal bridge and nose
 prognathism occasionally

Ophthalmic features:
 bilateral congenital nuclear opacities (100%)
 severe amblyopia
 nystagmus (93%)
 strabismus (43%)
 microcornea (96%)
 congenital glaucoma
 scleral staphylomas
 retinal cystoid degeneration 
 microphthalmia

These lead to severe visual impairment in affected males.

Other:
 The fourth metacarpal may be shortened

30% of patients also have some degree of intellectual impairment: of these 80% are mildly to moderately affected: the other 20% may have developmental delays and behavior problems.

Carrier females display milder variable symptoms of disease. Ocular signs are present in 90% of heterozygous females. These are typically lens opacities often involving the posterior Y sutures. More rarely dental anomalies and the characteristic facial features may also occur.

Genetics

This syndrome is caused by mutations in the Nance Horan gene (NHS) which is located on the short arm of the X chromosome (Xp22.13).

Diagnosis

Management

There is no known cure for this syndrome. Patients usually need ophthalmic surgery and may also need dental surgery. Genetic counseling and screening of the mother's relatives is recommended.

History

This syndrome was first described by Margaret B. Horan and Walter Elmore Nance in 1974.

References

External links 

Blindness
Disorders of lens
Rare genetic syndromes
Congenital disorders of eyes
Syndromes affecting teeth
Syndromes affecting the eye
Syndromes with craniofacial abnormalities